The Commonwealth of the Philippines ( or) was the administrative body that governed the Philippines from 1935 to 1946, aside from a period of exile in the Second World War from 1942 to 1945 when Japan occupied the country.  It was established following the Tydings–McDuffie Act to replace the Insular Government, a United States territorial government. The Commonwealth was designed as a transitional administration in preparation for the country's full achievement of independence. Its foreign affairs remained managed by the United States.

During its more than a decade of existence, the Commonwealth had a strong executive and a Supreme Court. Its legislature, dominated by the Nacionalista Party, was at first unicameral, but later bicameral. In 1937, the government selected Tagalog – the language of Manila and its surrounding provinces – as the basis of the national language, although it would be many years before its usage became general. Women's suffrage was adopted and the economy recovered to its pre-Depression level before the Japanese occupation in 1942.

In 1946, the Commonwealth ended and the Philippines claimed full sovereignty as provided for in Article XVIII of the 1935 Constitution.

Names 
The Commonwealth of the Philippines was also known as the "Philippine Commonwealth", or simply as "the Commonwealth". The 1935 Constitution uses "the Philippines" as the country's short-form name throughout its provisions and uses "the Philippine Islands" only to refer to pre-1935 status and institutions. Under the Insular Government (1901–1935), both terms were used officially. In 1937, Tagalog was declared to be the basis of a national language, effective after two years. The country's official name translated into Tagalog would be .

History

Creation 

The pre-1935 U.S. territorial administration, or Insular Government, was headed by a governor general who was appointed by the president of the United States. In December 1932, the U.S. Congress passed the Hare–Hawes–Cutting Act with the premise of granting Filipinos independence. Provisions of the law included reserving several military and naval bases for the United States, as well as imposing tariffs and quotas on Philippine exports. When it reached him for possible signature, President Herbert Hoover vetoed the Hare–Hawes–Cutting Act, but the American Congress overrode Hoover's veto in 1933 and passed the law over Hoover's objections. The bill, however, was opposed by the then-Philippine Senate President Manuel L. Quezon and was also rejected by the Philippine Senate.

This led to the creation and passing of the Tydings–McDuffie Act or the Philippine Independence Act, which allowed the establishment of the Commonwealth of the Philippines with a ten-year period of peaceful transition to full independence – the date of which was to be on the 4th of July following the tenth anniversary of the establishment of the Commonwealth.

A Constitutional Convention was convened in Manila on July 30, 1934. On February 8, 1935, the 1935 Constitution of the Commonwealth of the Philippines was approved by the convention by a vote of 177 to 1. The constitution was approved by President Franklin D. Roosevelt on March 25, 1935, and ratified by popular vote on May 14, 1935.

On September 16, 1935, presidential elections were held. Candidates included former president Emilio Aguinaldo, the Iglesia Filipina Independiente leader Gregorio Aglipay, and others. Manuel L. Quezon and Sergio Osmeña of the Nacionalista Party were proclaimed the winners, winning the seats of president and vice-president, respectively.

The Commonwealth government was inaugurated on the morning of November 15, 1935, in ceremonies held on the steps of the Legislative Building in Manila. The event was attended by a crowd of around 300,000 people.

Pre-War 
The new government embarked on ambitious nation-building policies in preparation for economic and political independence. These included national defense (such as the National Defense Act of 1935, which organized a conscription for service in the country), greater control over the economy, the perfection of democratic institutions, reforms in education, improvement of transport, the promotion of local capital, and industrialization.

However, uncertainties, especially in the diplomatic and military situation in Southeast Asia, in the level of U.S. commitment to the future Republic of the Philippines, and in the economy due to the Great Depression, proved to be major problems. The situation was further complicated by the presence of agrarian unrest, and of power struggles between Osmeña and Quezon, especially after Quezon was permitted to be re-elected after one six-year term.

A proper evaluation of the policies' effectiveness or failure is difficult due to Japanese invasion and occupation during World War II.

World War II 

Japan launched a surprise attack on the Philippines on December 8, 1941. The Commonwealth government drafted the Philippine Army into the U.S. Army Forces Far East, which would resist Japanese occupation. Manila was declared an open city to prevent its destruction, and it was occupied by the Japanese on January 2, 1942. Meanwhile, battles against the Japanese continued on the Bataan Peninsula, Corregidor, and Leyte until the final surrender of United States-Philippine forces in May 1942.

Quezon and Osmeña were escorted by troops from Manila to Corregidor, and later left for Australia prior to going to the U.S., where they set up a government in exile, based at the Shoreham Hotel, in Washington, D.C. This government participated in the Pacific War Council as well as the Declaration by United Nations. Quezon became ill with tuberculosis and died from it, with Osmeña succeeding him as president.

The main general headquarters of the Philippine Commonwealth Army (PCA), located on the military station in Ermita, Manila, was closed down on December 24, 1941. It was taken over by the Japanese Imperial forces when these occupied the city on January 2, 1942. Elsewhere in the country, other military posts of the PCA in Luzon, Visayas and Mindanao engaged in military action against the Japanese.

Meanwhile, the Japanese military organized a new government in the Philippines known as the Second Philippine Republic, headed by president José P. Laurel. This pro-Japanese government became very unpopular.

Resistance to the Japanese occupation continued in the Philippines. This included the Hukbalahap ("People's Army Against the Japanese"), which consisted of 30,000 armed men and controlled much of Central Luzon; they attacked both the Japanese and other non-Huk guerrillas. Remnants of the Philippine Army, as well as unsurrendered Americans, also successfully fought the Japanese through guerrilla warfare. These efforts eventually liberated all but 12 of the 48 provinces.

General Douglas MacArthur's army landed on Leyte on October 20, 1944, as well as the Philippine Commonwealth troops who arrived in other amphibious landings. The Philippine Constabulary was placed on active service with the Philippine Commonwealth Army and re-established on October 28, 1944, to June 30, 1946, during the Allied liberation to Post-World War II era. Fighting continued in remote corners of the Philippines until Japan's surrender in August 1945, which was signed on September 2 in Tokyo Bay. Estimates of Filipino war dead reached one million, and Manila was extensively damaged when Japanese marines refused to vacate the city when ordered to do so by the Japanese High Command.
After the war in the Philippines, the Commonwealth was restored and a one-year transitional period in preparation for independence began. Elections followed in April 1946 with Manuel Roxas winning as the first president of the independent Republic of the Philippines and Elpidio Quirino winning as vice-president.

Independence of the Philippines 

The Commonwealth ended when the U.S. recognized Philippine independence on July 4, 1946, as scheduled. However, the economy remained dependent on the U.S. This was due to the Bell Trade Act, otherwise known as the Philippine Trade Act, which was a precondition for receiving war rehabilitation grants from the United States.

Policies

Uprisings and agrarian reform 

During the Commonwealth period, tenant farmers held grievances often rooted to debt caused by the sharecropping system, as well as by the dramatic increase in population, which added economic pressure to the tenant farmers' families. As a result, an agrarian reform program was initiated by the Commonwealth. However, success of the program was hampered by ongoing clashes between tenants and landowners.

An example of these clashes includes one initiated by Benigno Ramos through his Sakdalista movement, which advocated tax reductions, land reforms, the breakup of the large estates or haciendas, and the severing of American ties. The uprising, which occurred in Central Luzon in May 1935, claimed about a hundred lives.

National language 
As per the 1935 constitution, the commonwealth had two official languages: English and Spanish. Due to the diverse number of Philippine languages, a provision calling for the "development and adoption of a common national language based on the existing native dialects" was drafted into the 1935 constitution. In 1936, the national assembly enacted Commonwealth Act No. 184, creating the Surián ng Wikang Pambansà (National Language Institute). This body was initially composed of President Quezon and six other members from various ethnic groups. In 1937. after deliberations, the body selected Tagalog as the basis for the national language.  This was made official on December 30, 1937, in an executive order which became effective two years after issuance.

In 1940, the government authorized the creation of a dictionary and grammar book for the language. In that same year, Commonwealth Act 570 was passed, allowing Filipino to become an official language upon independence.

Economy 
The cash economy of the Commonwealth was mostly agriculture-based. Products included abaca, coconuts and coconut oil, sugar, and timber. Numerous other crops and livestock were grown for local consumption by the Filipino people. Other sources for foreign income included the spin-off from money spent at American military bases on the Philippines such as the naval base at Subic Bay and Clark Air Base (with U.S. Army airplanes there as early as 1919), both on the island of Luzon.

The performance of the economy was initially good despite challenges from various agrarian uprisings. Taxes collected from a robust coconut industry helped boost the economy by funding infrastructure and other development projects. However, growth was halted due to the outbreak of World War II.

Demographics 
In 1939, a census of the Philippines was taken and determined that it had a population of 16,000,303; of these 15.7 million were counted as "Brown", 141.8 thousand as "Yellow",  50.5 thousand as "Mixed", 29.1 thousand as "Negro", 19.3 thousand as "White", and under 1 thousand "Other". In 1941, the estimated population of the Philippines reached 17,000,000; there were 117,000 Chinese, 30,000 Japanese, and 9,000 Americans. English was spoken by 26.3% of the population, according to the 1939 Census. Spanish, after English overtook it beginning in the 1920s, became a language for the elite and in government; it was later banned during the Japanese occupation.

Estimated numbers of speakers of the dominant languages:
Cebuano: 4,620,685
Tagalog: 3,068,565
Ilocano: 2,353,518
Hiligaynon: 1,951,005
Waray: 920,009
Kapampangan: 621,455
Pangasinan: 573,752

Government 
The Commonwealth had its own constitution, which remained effective after independence until 1973, and was self-governing although foreign policy and military affairs would be under the responsibility of the United States, and Laws passed by the legislature affecting immigration, foreign trade, and the currency system had to be approved by the United States president. Despite maintaining ultimate sovereignty, in some ways the US Government treated the Commonwealth as a sovereign state, and the Philippines sometimes acted in a state capacity in international relations.

During the 1935–41 period, the Commonwealth of the Philippines featured a very strong executive, a unicameral National Assembly, and a Supreme Court, all composed entirely of Filipinos, as well as an elected Resident Commissioner to the United States House of Representatives (as Puerto Rico does today). An American High Commissioner and an American Military Advisor, Douglas MacArthur headed the latter office from 1937 until the advent of World War II in 1941, holding the military rank of Field Marshal of the Philippines. After 1946, the rank of field marshal disappeared from the Philippine military.

During 1939 and 1940, after an amendment in the Commonwealth's Constitution, a bicameral Congress, consisting of a Senate, and of a House of Representatives, was restored, replacing the National Assembly.

Politics

List of presidents 
The colors indicate the political party or coalition of each president at Election Day.

Quezon administration (1935–1944) 

In 1935 Quezon won the Philippines' first national presidential election under the banner of the Nacionalista Party. He obtained nearly 68% of the vote against his two main rivals, Emilio Aguinaldo and Bishop Gregorio Aglipay. Quezon was inaugurated on November 15, 1935. He is recognized as the second President of the Philippines. When Manuel L. Quezon was inaugurated President of the Philippines in 1935, he became the first Filipino to head a government of the Philippines since Emilio Aguinaldo and the Malolos Republic in 1898. However, in January 2008, Congressman Rodolfo Valencia of Oriental Mindoro filed a bill seeking instead to declare General Miguel Malvar as the second Philippine President, who took control over all Filipino forces after American soldiers captured President Emilio Aguinaldo in Palanan, Isabela on March 23, 1901.

Quezon had originally been barred by the Philippine constitution from seeking re-election. However, in 1940, constitutional amendments were ratified allowing him to seek re-election for a fresh term ending in 1943. In the 1941 presidential elections, Quezon was re-elected over former Senator Juan Sumulong with nearly 82% of the vote.

In a notable humanitarian act, Quezon, in cooperation with U.S. High Commissioner Paul V. McNutt, facilitated the entry into the Philippines of Jewish refugees fleeing fascist regimes in Europe. Quezon was also instrumental in promoting a project to resettle the refugees in Mindanao.

The Japanese invasion of the Philippines began with an invasion of Batan Island on December 8, 1941. When advancing Japanese forces threatened Manila, President Quezon, other senior officials of the Commonwealth government, and senior American military commanders relocated to Corregidor island, and Manila was declared an open city. On February 20, Quezon, his family, and senior officials of the Commonwealth government were evacuated from the island by submarine on the first leg of what came to be a relocation of the Commonwealth government in exile to the U.S.

Quezon suffered from tuberculosis and spent his last years in a "cure cottage" in Saranac Lake, NY, where he died on August 1, 1944. He was initially buried in Arlington National Cemetery.

Osmeña administration (1944–1946) 

Osmeña became president of the Commonwealth on Quezon's death in 1944. He returned to the Philippines the same year with General Douglas MacArthur and the liberation forces. After the war Osmeña restored the Commonwealth government and the various executive departments. He continued the fight for Philippine independence.

For the presidential election of 1946 Osmeña refused to campaign, saying that the Filipino people knew of his record of 40 years of honest and faithful service. Nevertheless, he was defeated by Manuel Roxas, who won 54% of the vote and became the first president of the independent Republic of the Philippines.

Roxas Administration (May 28, 1946 – July 4, 1946) 

Roxas served as the President of the Commonwealth of the Philippines in a brief period, from his subsequent election on May 28, 1946, to July 4, 1946, the scheduled date of the proclamation of Philippine Independence. Roxas prepared the groundwork for the advent of a free and independent Philippines, assisted by the Congress (reorganized May 25, 1946), with Senator José Avelino as the Senate President and Congressman Eugenio Pérez as the House of Representatives Speaker. On June 3, 1946, Roxas appeared for the first time before the joint session of the Congress to deliver his first state of the nation address. Among other things, he told the members of the Congress the grave problems and difficulties the Philippines were set to face and reported on his special trip to the U.S. – the approval for independence.

On June 21, he reappeared in another joint session of the Congress and urged the acceptance of two important laws passed by the U.S. Congress on April 30, 1946, regarding the Philippine lands. They are the Philippine Rehabilitation Act and the Philippine Trade Act. Both recommendations were accepted by the Congress.

See also 
 Commonwealth (U.S. insular area)
 Political history of the Philippines
 History of the Philippines
 Philippine Organic Act (1902)
 Jones Law (Philippines) Philippines Organic Act (1916)
 Treaty of Paris (1898)
 Filipino Repatriation Act of 1935
 Hare–Hawes–Cutting Act (1932)

Notes

References

Bibliography 
.

.
.
.
.
.
.

External links 
 , detailing the functions of the different branches of the Philippine Commonwealth.
 .
 .
 .

 
States and territories disestablished in 1946
History of the Philippines (1898–1946)
Former countries in Philippine history
Philippine Commonwealth
Former regions and territories of the United States
Governments in exile during World War II
History of United States expansionism
Military history of the Philippines during World War II
Philippines–United States relations
States and territories established in 1935
1935 establishments in the Philippines
1946 disestablishments in the Philippines